Ian Carr is an English guitarist and record producer from Cumbria, who has performed with Swåp and The Kate Rusby Band.

He learned to play mouth organ at the age of three before going on to learn piano, piano accordion and rock guitar at the age of 13, since when he has developed his highly original style of accompaniment. He cites one of his many influences as Peerie Willie Johnson.

Until the late 1990s, Carr was a part of The Kathryn Tickell Band.
He plays a Collings acoustic guitar in both standard and dropped-D tunings.

Selected discography

Solo
Who He? - Ian Carr & The Various Artists (2013) Dalakollektivet Receords/ Reveal 
I Like Your Taste In Music -Ian Carr & The Various Artists (2020) Dalakollektivet Records

With others
Syncopace – Syncopace (1990) Black Crow Records CRO CD 226
Hootz! - Ian Carr and Simon Thoumire (1990) Black Crow Records CRO CD 225
The Kathryn Tickell Band – The Kathryn Tickell Band (1991) Black Crow Records CRO CD 227
Signs – The Kathryn Tickell Band (1993) Black Crow Records CRO CD 230
Shhh – Ian Carr & Karen Tweed (1995) Hypertension HYCD 200 147
New Directions In The Old - Roy Bailey (1997) Fuse 
Fyace – Ian Carr & Karen Tweed (1997) Fyasco FYASCD001
The Gathering – The Kathryn Tickell Band (1997) Park Records PRKCD39
SWÅP – Swåp (1997) Amigo AMCD735
Hourglass – Kate Rusby (1997) Pure Records PRCD02
The Northumberland Collection – Kathryn Tickell and friends (1998) Park Records PRKCD42
Cowsong – Kate Rusby (1998) Pure Records PRCD04
[Sic] – Swåp (1999) NorthSide NSD6042
Half As Happy As We – The Two Duos Quartet (1999) Ruf Records RUFCD07
Knock John – Chris Wood and Andy Cutting (1999) Ruf Records RUFCD08
Sleepless – Kate Rusby (1999) Pure Records PRCD06
Little Lights – Kate Rusby (2001) Pure Records PRCD07
Mosquito Hunter – Swåp (2002) Amigo AMCD750
One Roof Under – Andy Cutting & Karen Tweed (2002) Fyasco records FYC004
Faerd – Faerd (2002) Tutl SHD55
Heartlands – Kate Rusby and John McCusker (2003) Pure Records PRCD11
Underneath the Stars – Kate Rusby (2003) Pure Records PRCD12
Sings the Songs of Robert Burns - Eddi Reader (2003 ) Rough Trade RTRADCDX097
Step on it! – Ian Carr & Niklas Roswall (2003) Drone Music AB DROCD035
Du Da – Swåp (2005) NorthSide NSD6085
Black Water - Kris Drever (2006) Reveal Records REVEAL12P
Timber! - Maria Jonsson, Ian Carr and Mikael Marin (2007) Nordic Tradition NTCD09
Peacetime - Eddi Reader ( 2007) Rough Trade RTRADCD233
Awkward Annie – Kate Rusby (2007) Pure Records PRCD23
Sweet Bells - Kate Rusby (2008) Pure Records PRCD28
Before the Ruin - Drever, McCusker & Woomble (2008) Navigator Records NAVIGATOR1
Hold Your Horses — Ella Edmondson (2009) Monsoon MONMUCD001
Mark the Hard Earth - Kris Drever (2010) Navigator Records NAVIGATOR30
Levande - Sofia Karlsson (2011)
Tänk Om - Imagine If - Sandén-Nygårds-Carr (2012) Westpark Music
He Thinks He`s Invisible - Ian Carr and Simon Thoumire (2013) Foot Stomping'
Angels Without Wings - Heidi Talbot (2013) Compass Records
Vagabond - Eddi Reader (2014) Reveal Records
Regnet Faller Utan Oss - Sofia Karlsson (2014)
If Wishes Were Horses - Kris Drever (2016) Reveal Records
Natt blir dag - Sandén Nygårds Carr (2016) Dalakollektivet Records
 Time Flies Carr & Roswall- (2018) Dalakollektivet Records
 Where The World Is Thin-Kris Drever-(2020) Reveal Records

References

External links

Year of birth missing (living people)
Living people
English folk guitarists
English male guitarists
Musicians from Yorkshire